Henry Dockrell may refer to:

 Henry Morgan Dockrell (1880–1955), Irish Cumann na nGaedhael and Fine Gael politician who was elected to both Dáil Éireann and Seanad Éireann
Percy Dockrell, full name Henry Percy Dockrell, son of the above, (1914–1979), Irish Fine Gael party politician, TD for Dún Laoghaire 1951–1977